Pierre Arditi (born 1 December 1944) is a French actor. He is the brother of French actress Catherine Arditi.

Life and career

Born in Paris, his father was the painter Georges Arditi, from Marseille of Jewish descent, and his mother Yvonne Leblicq was Belgian from Brussels.

In 1987 he won a César Award for Best Actor in a Supporting Role for his role in Mélo, and in 1994, a César Award for Best Actor for his role in Smoking/No Smoking.

Although his work has primarily been in French film and theater, Arditi is known in the Anglophone world as the French voice of Christopher Reeve.  Arditi dubbed Christopher Reeve on the French-language version of the three first Superman films by Richard Donner and Richard Lester. Because of the added footage in the DVD Special Edition of Donner's Superman, the film had to be re-dubbed with a different voice actor. He also provided the French voice for Reeve in the comedy/whodunit Deathtrap. He was the voice of the documentary series Untamed Africa, written and produced by Frederic Lepage.

He was made Chevalier (Knight) of the Légion d'honneur in 2002. He was made Chevalier (Knight) of the Ordre national du Mérite on 7 April 1994, and promoted Officier (Officer) in 2005.

Filmography

References

External links

1944 births
Living people
Best Actor César Award winners
Chevaliers of the Légion d'honneur
French male film actors
French male stage actors
French male voice actors
French people of Belgian descent
Officers of the Ordre national du Mérite
20th-century French male actors
21st-century French male actors
Best Supporting Actor César Award winners
French people of Jewish descent
Audiobook narrators